Xedré is one of 54 parishes in Cangas del Narcea, a municipality within the province and autonomous community of Asturias, in northern Spain.

Villages
 Xedré
 Xalón
 Piedrafita
 El Barrial
 El Barriu Nuevu
 El Campu
 La Casa'l Chacal
 La Casa Utieḷḷos
 El Corral
 El Vaḷḷe

References

Parishes in Cangas del Narcea